Uwe Kagelmann (born 6 September 1950 in Dresden, Saxony, East Germany/GDR) is a German former competitive pair skater. Competing with Manuela Groß, he was twice bronze medalist at the Olympics. He later became a figure skating coach.

The pair skated for the SV Dynamo club and represented East Germany. Their coach was Heinz-Friedrich Lindner. He now works as a figure skating coach at the Feldkircher Eislauf Verein Montfort club in Austria.

Results
pairs with Groß

See also 
 World Figure Skating Championships

References

External links
https://web.archive.org/web/20060502042510/http://www.eklscberlin.arcgraph.de/
https://web.archive.org/web/20060903184859/http://www.feldkirch.org/

1950 births
Living people
Sportspeople from Dresden
German male pair skaters
Olympic figure skaters of East Germany
Figure skaters at the 1972 Winter Olympics
Figure skaters at the 1976 Winter Olympics
Olympic bronze medalists for East Germany
Olympic medalists in figure skating
World Figure Skating Championships medalists
European Figure Skating Championships medalists
Medalists at the 1976 Winter Olympics
Medalists at the 1972 Winter Olympics
Recipients of the Patriotic Order of Merit in bronze